Elections to Calderdale Metropolitan Borough Council were held on 3 May 2007 with the exception of the Warley ward which was postponed until 14 June 2007 due to the sudden death of one of the candidates. One third of the council was up for election and the council stayed under no overall control with a minority Conservative administration. The total turnout of the election was 38.01% (51,586 voters of an electorate of 135,729). The winning candidate in each ward is highlighted in bold.

Brighouse Councillor Nick Yates, who had left the Conservative Party in 2006 to become an Independent, joined the Liberal Democrats in the summer of 2007.

The table below summarises the results of the 2007 local government election. Each party is ordered by number of votes registered. 17 of the 51 seats were up for re-election.

Council results
Percentage change calculated compared to the previous election's results.

Council Composition
Prior to the election the composition of the council was:

After the election the composition of the council was:

Ward results
Percentage change calculated compared to the last time these candidates stood for election.

Brighouse ward

The incumbent was Joyce Cawthra for the Conservative Party.

Calder ward

The incumbent was Michael Taylor for the Liberal Democrats.

Elland ward

The incumbent was Edgar Waller for the Liberal Democrats.

Greetland and Stainland ward

The incumbent was Patrick Phillips for the Liberal Democrats.

Hipperholme and Lightcliffe ward

The incumbent was David Kirton for the Conservative Party.

Illingworth and Mixenden ward

The incumbent was Richard Mulhall for the BNP.

Luddendenfoot ward

The incumbent was Jane Brown for the Liberal Democrats.

Northowram and Shelf ward

The incumbent was Roger Taylor for the Conservative Party.

Ovenden ward

The incumbent was Bryan Smith for the Labour Party.

Park ward

The incumbent was Arshad Mahmmod for the Labour Party.

Rastrick ward

The incumbent was John Williamson for the Conservative Party.

Ryburn ward

The incumbent was Robert Thornber for the Conservative Party.

Skircoat ward

The incumbent was John Ford for the Conservative Party.

Sowerby Bridge ward

The incumbent was Andrew Feather for the Conservative Party.

Todmorden ward

The incumbent was Olwen Jennings for the Liberal Democrats.

Town ward

The incumbent was Timothy Swift for the Labour Party.

Warley ward
The election for this ward seat was postponed by the sudden death of the Conservative candidate Richard Maycock. He was replaced by John Foran, who had stood in the Elland ward above. The new election date was held on 14 June 2007.

The incumbent was Jennifer Pearson for the Liberal Democrats.

References

2007
2007 English local elections
2000s in West Yorkshire